Miroslav Stanovský (born October 18, 1970 in Ružomberok, Czechoslovakia) is a Slovak born Latvian slalom canoeist who has competed since the late 1980s. He finished tenth in the K1 event at the 1996 Summer Olympics in Atlanta. He is the first Slovak paddler to win an individual medal in the men's K1 category with a silver at the inaugural European Canoe Slalom Championships in Augsburg (1996). He is currently competing for Latvia.

References
Overview of athlete's results at CanoeSlalom.net
Sports-Reference.com profile

1970 births
Canoeists at the 1996 Summer Olympics
Living people
Olympic canoeists of Slovakia
Slovak male canoeists
Latvian male canoeists
Sportspeople from Ružomberok